Andrei Florin Rațiu (born 20 June 1998) is a Romanian professional footballer who plays for Segunda División club Huesca and the Romania national team. Mainly a right-back, he can also be deployed as a right winger.

Club career

Early career / Villarreal
Born in Aiud, Alba County, Rațiu moved to Aragon, Spain at the age of six and joined Villarreal's youth setup from Andorra CF. He made his senior debut with the C-team on 20 August 2016, coming on as a second-half substitute in a 2–2 Tercera División away draw against Alzira. Rațiu scored his first senior goal on 14 September 2016, netting the opener in a 2–1 away defeat of Elche Ilicitano.

After being regularly used with the C-side, Rațiu made his debut for the reserves on 17 December 2017, replacing Darío Poveda late into a 3–2 home win against Peña Deportiva in the Segunda División B championship. He was definitely promoted to the B-team in August 2018, being regularly used afterwards. He made his first team debut the following 18 April, starting in a 0–2 derby loss at Valencia for the season's UEFA Europa League.

On 4 August 2020, Rațiu was loaned to Dutch Eredivisie side ADO Den Haag for the campaign. He returned to his parent club the following 29 January, after 12 appearances.

Huesca
On 4 August 2021, Rațiu signed a three-year contract with Huesca, recently relegated to Segunda División.

International career
Rațiu made his debut for the Romania national team on 2 September 2021, in a 2–0 win over Iceland in the 2022 World Cup qualifiers. He started the game and was substituted after 68 minutes.

Career statistics

Club

International

Scores and results list Romania's goal tally first, score column indicates score after each Rațiu goal.

References

External links
 
 

1998 births
Living people
People from Aiud
Romanian emigrants to Spain
Romanian footballers
Association football defenders
Segunda División B players
Segunda División players
Tercera División players
Villarreal CF C players
Villarreal CF B players
Villarreal CF players
SD Huesca footballers
Eredivisie players
ADO Den Haag players
Romanian expatriate footballers
Romanian expatriate sportspeople in Spain
Expatriate footballers in Spain
Expatriate footballers in the Netherlands
Romanian expatriate sportspeople in the Netherlands
Romania under-21 international footballers
Romania international footballers
Olympic footballers of Romania
Footballers at the 2020 Summer Olympics